Azygophleps sponda is a moth in the  family Cossidae found in South Africa.

References

Endemic moths of South Africa
Moths described in 1875
Azygophleps
Moths of Africa